Polo was held once at the Pan American Games, in 1951 the first edition of the games.

Men's tournament

References

  .

1951
Events at the 1951 Pan American Games
1951 in polo